The 3rd Individual European Artistic Gymnastics Championships for both men and women were held in Milan, Italy, on 29 March to 5 April 2009.

Medal winners

Men's

Individual all-around

Finals

Floor

Pommel horse

Rings

Vault

Parallel bars

Horizontal bar

Women's

Individual all-around

Finals

Vault

Uneven bars

Balance beam

Floor

Medal count

Men

Women

Overall

External links
 Official Website

2009
Sports competitions in Milan
European Artistic Gymnastics Championships
2009 in Italian sport
International gymnastics competitions hosted by Italy
2009 in European sport
March 2009 sports events in Europe
April 2009 sports events in Europe
2009,Artistic Gymnastics,European Championships